Nick Mulgrew (born 1990) is a South African-British novelist, poet, and editor. In addition to his writing, he is the founder and director of the poetry press uHlanga.

Education 

Mulgrew studied English and Journalism at Rhodes University, Makhanda, and later at the University of Cape Town, at which he was a Mandela Rhodes Scholar. He is currently a PhD candidate at the University of Dundee.

Writing 

Mulgrew is the author of four books, and is best known for his short fiction. His first collection of stories, Stations, was published in 2016 when he was 25. The book was longlisted for the 2017 Edge Hill Short Story Prize and shortlisted for the 2017 Nadine Gordimer Award. Mulgrew eventually won the 2018 Nadine Gordimer Award with his second collection of stories, The First Law of Sadness, which was published in 2017. His stories have elsewhere appeared in The White Review, World Literature Today, and New Contrast.

His first novel, A Hibiscus Coast, was published in South Africa by Karavan Press in 2021.

His first poetry collection, the myth of this is that we're all in this together, was published by uHlanga in 2015.

Publishing 
In 2014, Mulgrew founded the poetry press uHlanga, which he operates and directs. Mulgrew commissions and designs all of the press's books, and edits most of them.

uHlanga has launched the careers in publication of many South African poets, most notably Maneo Mohale and Koleka Putuma, who are both winners of the Glenna Luschei Prize for African Poetry for titles published by uHlanga.

The press's authors and books have also won various South African awards, including two Ingrid Jonker Prizes (for Failing Maths and My Other Crimes by Thabo Jijana and Zikr by Saaleha Idrees Bamjee) and two South African Literary Awards for Poetry (for Prunings by Helen Moffett and All the Places by Musawenkosi Khanyile).

Mulgrew was a founding associate editor of the Cape Town-based literary magazine Prufrock, and continued to be its fiction editor until it ceased publication.

Other work and awards

From 2013 to 2015, Mulgrew was the beer critic for South African Sunday Times.

Mulgrew is the winner of the 2016 Thomas Pringle Award for Short Stories, the National Arts Festival Short Sharp Stories Awards in 2014, and a South African Arts Journalism Awards Special Silver Merit for Features, 2014. He was shortlisted for The White Review Prize  and the Ake/Air France Prize for Prose in 2015. He was also a nominee for the South African Arts Journalist of the Year Award in 2014.

Mulgrew won the 2022 K. Sello Duiker Memorial Award for his novel A Hibiscus Coast.

Bibliography

Novel 

 A Hibiscus Coast (2021)

Short story collections 

Stations (2016)
 The First Law of Sadness (2017)

Poetry 

 the myth of this is that we're all in this together (2015)

References

External links

uHlanga

1990 births
Living people
South African writers